Cattin' with Coltrane and Quinichette is a studio album by jazz musicians John Coltrane and Paul Quinichette released in October 1959 on Prestige Records. It was recorded at the studio of Rudy Van Gelder in Hackensack, New Jersey, and issued two years after the recording sessions took place, and after Coltrane's Prestige contract had ended.

Track listing
All tracks composed by Mal Waldron, except where indicated.
 "Cattin'" – 7:20
 "Sunday" – 6:58 (Chester Conn - Ned Miller - Jule Styne)
 "Exactly Like You" – 6:45 (Jimmy McHugh - Dorothy Fields)
 "Anatomy" – 8:48
 "Vodka" – 9:02
 "Tea for Two" – 8:05 (Vincent Youmans - Irving Caesar)*

Bonus track on CD reissue

Personnel
 John Coltrane – tenor saxophone (except on #3 & #6)
 Paul Quinichette – tenor saxophone
 Julian Euell – double bass
 Ed Thigpen – drums
 Mal Waldron – piano

References

1959 albums
John Coltrane albums
Prestige Records albums
Albums produced by Bob Weinstock
Paul Quinichette albums
Collaborative albums
Albums recorded at Van Gelder Studio